Budapesti Torna Club was a Hungarian sports club in Budapest and the first football club in the country. Its football team were the winners of the first two seasons of Nemzeti Bajnokság I, in 1901 and 1902.

History 
The club was founded on January 21, 1897. It was the first official football club to be founded in Hungary, and it will soon be followed by many others. On September 18 of the same year, it played the first official match in Hungarian history, between two internal teams, the blue-white one and the red-white one, with the former winning 5-0.

On October 31 it played the first international match of a Hungarian club, when it  played against Austria's Vienna Cricket and Football Club in Vienna , losing 2-0.

It was one of the founders of the Hungarian football leagues, the Nemzeti Najnokság, and the winner of its first two editions.

After 1925 the club played only in the amateur leagues and it was dissolved during season 1945-46.

Honours

Nemzeti Bajnokság I: 1901, 1902

Hungarian Cup Runner-up: 1909–10

Name changes
1885–1945: Budapesti Torna Club
1935: merger with Budapest SE
?: exit from Budapest SE

References

External links
 Profile

Football clubs in Budapest
Defunct football clubs in Hungary
1885 establishments in Hungary

